Shelli Avenevoli is an American epidemiologist working as deputy director of the National Institute of Mental Health. She is a co-investigator on the National Comorbidity Study.

Education 
Avenevoli received her Ph.D. in Developmental Psychology from Temple University. Her 1998 dissertation was titled The continuity of depression from childhood to adolescence. Avenevoli's doctoral advisor was Laurence Steinberg.

Avenevoli completed an National Institute of Mental Health (NIMH)-funded postdoctoral fellowship in psychiatric epidemiology at Yale School of Medicine.

Career 
In 2001, Avenevoli joined the NIMH intramural research program as a staff scientist in the Section of Developmental Genetic Epidemiology of the Mood and Anxiety Disorders Program. In 2005, she moved to the NIMH division of extramural research as chief of the Emotion, Mood, and Depressive Disorders Program. In 2008, Avenevoli became chief of the Developmental Trajectories of Mental Disorders Branch. In this role, she developed NIMH’s translational neurodevelopmental research portfolio and a research program on bipolar disorder and early, chronic irritability in children. Avenevoli is involved in NIMH efforts, including revising the strategic plan, re-defining the Institute’s approach to supporting research in neurodevelopment and bipolar disorder, and serving as a liaison to other agencies for special initiatives. Avenevoli is deputy director of NIMH. She is a co-investigator on the National Comorbidity Study.

References

External links 

 

Living people
Year of birth missing (living people)
Place of birth missing (living people)
American women epidemiologists
American epidemiologists
21st-century American women scientists
Temple University alumni
National Institutes of Health people